William Blacklock may refer to:
William James Blacklock (1816–1858), English landscape painter
William Kay Blacklock (1870–1924), British watercolours and oils artist
William Blacklock (mayor) (1889–1965), New Zealand politician, mayor of Henderson

See also
William Blacklock House, a historic building in Charleston, South Carolina